Dyer Island is an island in Narragansett Bay in Rhode Island, United States. It lies off the west coast of Aquidneck Island and is part of Melville CDP, which itself is part of the town of Portsmouth. The island lies between Melville and Prudence Island and is uninhabited and has a land area of 0.12 km² (29.65 acres) and is only 13 feet above sea level.

The salt marshes of Dyer Island are among the last remaining in Rhode Island without mosquito ditches, and the island is home to various shorebirds.

In the seventeenth century, Dyer Island was named after William Dyer, the husband of the Quaker martyr  Mary Dyer. William Dyer was one of the founders of Rhode Island, and in 1638 he sailed past the island and requested that it be granted to him, which was done according to Roger Williams and other affiants. William Dyer died in 1676 in Newport, Rhode Island. He is buried in the family cemetery which was located on the family farm in Newport not on Dyer Island in Narragansett Bay.

In 2001 the Island was purchased by the state of Rhode Island and is now part of the Narragansett Bay National Estuarine Research Reserve, as well as JDSinc.

References

Dyer Island: Block 9021, Census Tract 401.03, Newport County, Rhode Island United States Census Bureau

Islands of Newport County, Rhode Island
Islands of Narragansett Bay
Islands of Rhode Island
Uninhabited islands of the United States